is a Japanese photographer. He is the co-founder of and the main contributor to the Japanese photo magazine Asphalt. His work has been exhibited both in Japan and internationally.

Life and career
Fujiwara was born in Okayama City in 1963. His family soon moved to Ōyamazaki (Kyoto), and moved again to Shiga when he was at primary school. He lived in Yasu (Shiga) until he was 26, and considers himself a native of Shiga.

After working as an interior designer, Fujiwara went to Britain in 1989, working as an architectural designer and in the restaurant business. Back in Japan, in 2005 he set up a photographic studio. A year later, he started out as a photographer, this unusually late start being helped by the photographers  and Daidō Moriyama.

Together with the photographer Shin'ichirō Tōjinbara, Fujiwara set out to create a photography magazine, Asphalt, that would avoid the commercial priorities of mainstream Japanese photography and photography magazines, and that would run for just ten issues. From the second issue on,  joined as editor, and the normal pattern was to combine work by Fujiwara, Tōjinbara and, as a guest photographer, someone who was not already a star but who instead merited exposure. These guest photographers included Yang Seungwoo and Takehiko Nakafuji. Asphalt is in the holdings of several art museums outside Japan, and its content is available online.

It borrows the title Nangokushō from a collection of tanka by Fujiwara's grandfather, Tōmon Fujiwara (the pseudonym of Hiroji Fujiwara), who, after workplace conflicts elsewhere, had eventually settled down to a satisfying post as teacher in Kagoshima. The book presents photographs of Kagoshima from 2009 and 2010.

Butterfly Had a Dream shows the family life in Miyako-jima and the work and single life in Tokyo of a professional kinbaku practitioner. Her father, a suicide victim, had been a professional butterfly collector, and the book brings to mind the metamorphoses in the life of a butterfly.

As a child, Fujiwara had visited Nagashima Aiseien, a leper sanatorium, whose general manager was an uncle of his. He returned there 35 years later, influenced by Kaijin Akashi, who had been incarcerated there and had died there, but whose poems continued to express joy despite his loss of sight and other physical decay. For his book Poet Island (2015), Fujiwara photographed the sanatorium and depicted mementoes of Akashi's. Recommending an exhibition of these photographs at Zen Foto Gallery (Roppongi), Kōtarō Iizawa praised this and Fujiwara's two previous photobooks as of high quality.

Semimaru (2017) is named after  that in turn is named after its main character.

Exhibitions
 Trace, Sokyu-sha Gallery (Shinjuku, Tokyo), 2009.
 Asphalt photo exhibition, Rencontres d'Arles (Arles, France), 2010 (with work by Kōji Onaka and Photographer Hal); Zen Foto Gallery (Beijing), 2011 (with work by Yang Seung-Woo and Muge); Tanto Tempo Gallery (Kobe, Japan), 2012
 Kagoshima, Sokyu-sha Gallery (Shinjuku, Tokyo), 2010.
 Poet's island, Sokyu-sha Gallery (Shinjuku, Tokyo), 2011.
 Butterfly had a dream, Sokyu-sha Gallery (Shinjuku, Tokyo), 2012; Tanto Tempo Gallery (Kobe, Japan), 2014; Reclaim Photography West Midlands 2016, Wolverhampton Art Gallery, England, 2016; 6th Different Dimension Festival, the State Novosibirsk Art Museum, Russia, 2016
 Nangokusho, Sokyu-sha Gallery (Shinjuku, Tokyo), 2013; Tanto Tempo Gallery (Kobe, Japan), 2014; Reclaim Photography Festival, Lighthouse Media Centre (Wolverhampton, England), 2018
 Nangokusho (together with work by Yang Seung-Woo and Tomohisa Tobitsuka), In)(between record vol. 1, In)(between Art Gallery (Paris), 2013.
 Japanese Eyes, In)(between record vol. 12, In)(between Art Gallery (Paris), 2014. Group exhibition.
 Poet Island, Zen Foto Gallery (Roppongi Tokyo), 2015; Gallery722 (Okayama, Japan), 2015; Sokyu-sha Gallery (Shinjuku, Tokyo), 2015; Reclaim Photography West Midlands (Birmingham, England), 2017
 Semimaru, Sokyu-sha Gallery (Shinjuku, Tokyo), 2017; Gallery722 (Okayama, Japan), 2017.
 Un regard sur ses publications = A Look into His Publications, In)(between record vol. 31, In)(between Art Gallery (Paris), 2017.
 Tukurohi, Mii-dera (Ōtsu, Japan), 2018.
 Semimaru, within Beauty in Imperfection (group show), Reclaim Photography Festival West Midlands (Birmingham England), 2020
 2200Miles, Books and Modern, Tokyo, 2020 + Blue Sheep Gallery Tokyo, 2020

Publications
 Asphalt (10 issues). Asphalt Publishing, 2008–2012.
 Nangokushō = Nangokusho: Ode to the Southern Lands of Japan. Tokyo: Sokyu-sha, 2013. .
 Chō no mita yume = Butterfly Had a Dream. Tokyo: Sokyu-sha, 2014. .
 Wombat No. 16. Paris: Wombat, 2015. Contains a print by Fujiwara, a portfolio by William Klein, a print by Utagawa Hiroshige, and a "silkscreen print with Aesop complicity".
 Shijin no shima = Poet Island. Tokyo: Sokyu-sha, 2015. .
 Semimaru = Semimaru. Tokyo: Sokyu-sha, 2017. 
 2200Miles. Tokyo: Sokyu-sha, 2019.

Notes

References

External links
Fujiwara's website

1963 births
Living people
Japanese photographers
People from Shiga Prefecture